
Lago di Palagnedra is a manmade lake at Palagnedra, Ticino, Switzerland. The dam on the Melezza river was completed in 1952, height .

The lake lies between Pizzo Ruscada and the Gridone. The north side of the lake is overlooked by the Domodossola-Locarno railway.

External links
Swissdams: Palagnedra

Lakes of Ticino
Reservoirs in Switzerland